The Dahm House is a historic townhouse in Mobile, Alabama.  The two-story brick structure was built in 1873 for John Dahm.  It was designed by Bassett Capps. A two-story frame addition was added in 1929. The house was added to the National Register of Historic Places on January 5, 1984.  In addition to being listed individually on the National Register of Historic Places, it is also a contributing building to the Lower Dauphin Street Historic District.

References

National Register of Historic Places in Mobile, Alabama
Houses on the National Register of Historic Places in Alabama
Houses in Mobile, Alabama
Houses completed in 1873